Women's Media Center (WMC) is a 501(c)(3) nonprofit women's organization in the United States founded in 2005 by writers and activists Jane Fonda, Robin Morgan, and Gloria Steinem. Led by President Julie Burton, WMC's work includes advocacy campaigns, giving out awards, media and leadership training, and the creation of original content.

Women's representation in media
The Women's Media Center "works to ensure women are powerfully and visibly represented in the media" and "to diversify the media in its content and sources, so that the stories and perspectives of women and girls are more accurately portrayed."  The organization convenes panels, issues reports, organizes grassroots campaigns, and meets with media outlets to address issues of women's representation and general diversity.

In response to the report from the American Psychological Association's Task Force on the Sexualization of Girls, the Women's Media Center partnered with over 10 other organizations to organize the Sexualization Protest: Action, Resistance, Knowledge, also known as the SPARK Summit. The SPARK Summit took place on October 22, 2010, at Hunter College in New York City.

The Women's Media Center gives out a Social Media Award, which "recognizes individuals who have made outstanding contributions to advancing women’s and girls’ visibility and power in media". Jude Doyle received the first award in 2011.

Media training and expert sources
In 2008, WMC launched the Progressive Women's Voices media and leadership training program to connect qualified, authoritative women experts to editors, reporters, producers, and bookers.  SheSource, WMC's online database of over 500 women experts, serves journalists looking for female sources, commentators, and guests.

Sexism watchdog
WMC acts as a watchdog for sexism in the media and develops campaigns to advocate for fair and balanced coverage. During the 2008 presidential election, WMC released a video "Sexism Sells but We're Not Buying It," along with a petition campaign to call attention to sexism against female candidates during the primaries. Another video, "Media Justice for Sotomayor," discusses racist and sexist media coverage during the 2009 confirmation hearings of Supreme Court Justice Sonia Sotomayor.

On August 31, 2010, the WMC partnered with the Women's Campaign Forum Foundation and the Political Parity Initiative of the Hunt Alternatives Fund to launch Name it. Change it. (NICI), a ground-breaking national campaign that addresses sexism in the media targeted at female politicians and political candidates. NICI aims to ensure accountability through a coordinated rapid response network to dramatically decrease incidences of media misogyny.

Health care reform and reproductive rights
In reaction to the 2009 Stupak–Pitts Amendment and other proposed health care reform legislation limiting access and funding for abortions, WMC began actively advocating for women's reproductive rights. On December 10, 2009, WMC announced the launch of its Not Under The Bus campaign to "keep women's health care fair, safe, and accessible to all."

With the campaign announcement, the organization declared its "first call to action is to stop the Stupak Amendment, the Hatch-Nelson Amendment, and others like them which are the most draconian restrictions on women since the 1977 Hyde Amendment that cut federal funding for abortions by Medicaid."

2010 campaign against CBS and Focus on the Family ad
In January 2010, Women's Media Center and a coalition of more than 30 organizations "dedicated to reproductive rights, tolerance, and social justice", including the National Organization for Women and NARAL Pro-Choice America, sent a letter to CBS, NFL and its advertisers calling on them to pull an advertisement featuring football player Tim Tebow, sponsored by conservative Christian group Focus on the Family (FOTF), from Super Bowl XLIV.  The resulting campaign garnered widespread national media attention. Previously, in 2010 CBS had rejected a humorous ad from a gay online dating service, ManCrunch, and in 2004 an ad promoting the United Church of Christ as gay-friendly, citing a policy against any controversy in Super Bowl ad. CBS then decided to end this policy and accept controversial ads, so that the anti-abortion ad would be aired, which the Gay & Lesbian Alliance Against Defamation (GLAAD) called a "homophobic double standard."

In its letter to CBS, the WMC coalition denounced the actions of Focus on the Family and politics of CBS, based on their acceptance of their advertisement.

The WMC campaign was criticized for freedom of speech concerns. A New York Times editorial called it censorship, and said that they should use this as an opportunity to promote their own movement. A Los Angeles Times editorial, despite their stance in favor of abortion rights, congratulated CBS for their decision. Bill O'Reilly of Fox News said Greene and her group were, "trying to muzzle them. That's not the American way." The coalition responded with an op-ed article in Huffington Post in which former WMC President Jehmu Greene wrote that they were not attempting to censor anything, and suggested that the situation would be different if the Ku Klux Klan were involved.

During Super Bowl XLIV, CBS elected to air the two 30-second commercials, which included Tebow's personal story as part of an overall anti-abortion stance.

Women Under Siege 

Women Under Siege is a project of the Women's Media Center. It has reported on the use of rape as a means of oppression in Syria. Women Under Siege has also reported extensively about the continued use of rape as a weapon of war in Myanmar (also known as Burma).

Selected works
WMC Status of Women in US Media (2017, 2015, 2014, 2013, 2012)
WMC Investigation:  
Analysis of Gender & Non-Acting Oscar Nominations (2017, 2016, 2015, 2014, 2013)
Analysis of Gender & Primetime Non-Acting Emmy Nominations (2016, 2015, 2014, 2013, 2012)
10-Year Review of Gender & Oscar Nominations in Non-Acting Categories (2016)
10-Year Review of Gender & Emmy Nominations in Non-Acting Categories (2015)

WMC Media Watch:  
Women & Elections — Where Voters Saw the Most Sexist Treatment of Women Candidates in Media (2016)
Women & Elections — #WhoTalks — U.S. Presidential Election Tracking of Cable/TV News Show Analysts by Gender and Race (2016) (Partnership project with GenderAvenger and the Rutgers Center for American Women and Politics)
The Gender Gap in Coverage of Reproductive Issues (2016)
Writing Rape — How U.S. Media Cover Campus Rape and Sexual Assault (2015)

WMC Guide to Covering Reproductive Issues (2013)
Name It Change It:  
The Women's Media Center Guide to Gender Neutral Coverage of Candidates (2012)
Research on Appearance Coverage of Women Candidates (2013)
Stick Figures Explain Negative Impact of Appearance Coverage of Women Candidates (2013)

Bias, Punditry, And The Press — Where Do We Go From Here? (2008) (Report from the Women's Media Center, the White House Project, and the Maynard Institute for Journalism Education)
Unspinning the Spin:  The Women's Media Center Guide to Fair and Accurate Language (2014)
WMC Speech Project Wheel of Online Abuse & Harassment (2016)

References

External links
 WMC website
 WMC SheSource website
 WMC Women Under Siege Project

Women's organizations based in the United States
Communications and media organizations based in the United States
501(c)(3) organizations
American companies established in 2005
Feminist organizations in the United States
Organizations established in 2005